The Formula Mirage was a racing class supported by the Japan Automobile Federation and Mitsubishi. This racing class was started in the same year as the more successful Formula Toyota and lasted for six years between 1990 and 1995.

The cars
Formula Mirage was an open chassis class, open for all manufacturers. Only Van Diemen and Reynard Motorsports entered the series using converted Formula Ford 2000 chassis. All competitors had to use the same engine, the  2-liter, DOHC, 4-valve, Mitsubishi 4G63 engine. Despite the series name, the 4G63 engine was never used in a Mirage model, although the Mitsubishi Lancer Evolution series of cars which used the engines were based on the Mirage platform at the time the series ran.

Champions

All-time win list

References

Auto racing series in Japan
Formula racing
Formula racing series
Recurring sporting events established in 1990
Recurring events disestablished in 1995
Defunct auto racing series